is a 2018 horror-themed rail shooter arcade game developed by Sega Interactive, and is the fifth title in The House of the Dead series, following the release of The House of the Dead 4 in 2005.

It was scheduled for location testing on January 19–21, 2018 in Akihabara, Japan. It was released in all arcades of Japan on September 13, 2018, and was released in the United States through Dave & Buster's locations in October 2018.

Plot 
In 2006, three years after the events of The House of the Dead 4, AMS agent Kate Green joins forces with Ryan Taylor, the brother of her late partner and mentor, James, on an undercover mission in a dinner event within Scarecrow Manor. The manager unleashes his army of mutant creatures upon the dinner guests. Realizing the threat to the world, Kate and Ryan begin their quest to stop the manager and the outbreak he started.

Within the manor, Kate and Ryan find clues which reveal that the manager, Thornheart, is connected to the late bioterrorists Dr. Curien and Caleb Goldman. Kate explains that in 1880, the trio's ancestors formed an organization that was the catalyst for prior incidents that the AMS investigated. Thornheart contracted a fatal disease and was long believed dead, but survived and began developing a project named Noah's Ark after Curien and Goldman's deaths.

Kate and Ryan battle resurrected creatures from the 1998 Curien Mansion incident, Chariot and Hangedman, and a squid-like being named the Priestess. In a church, they find Thornheart, who states that the purpose of Noah's Ark is bring "new [human] evolution" to the world. He releases the Moon, a tree-like behemoth with air manipulation powers. The Moon gradually grows larger and stronger; realizing this, Ryan stabs an iron rod through its head. Lightning strikes the rod, electrocuting and killing the creature, which Kate believes was James intervening from the dead.

The next morning, Kate and Ryan rest as they watch the sun rise.

Endings 
The game has four endings based on the player's performance. Each ending concludes with the text "To be continued in the next HOUSE OF THE DEAD".

 Thornheart walks among rows of incubation tanks and says "It's impossible to change a predefined future."
 In the church, Thornheart claims that the ordeal has only begun, smiling as the camera glitches out.
 Thornheart stands from his chair and leaves the church, stating that he saw out "the evolution of envy" and vows to follow up with "arrogance".
 Kate recalls James' motto to never lose hope and keep fighting to the end, before leaving Scarecrow Manor with Ryan.

Characters 
 Ryan Taylor: James Taylor's brother who joins Kate to solve the Scarecrow Manor case.
 Kate Green: James Taylor's former partner who joins Ryan to solve the Scarecrow Manor case.
 Thornheart: The manager of Scarecrow Manor who unleashes his army of creatures upon the guests. He is also revealed to be the "Mystery Man" from The House of the Dead III and The House of the Dead 4.

Bosses 
 The Chariot (returning from The House of the Dead)
 The Priestess
 The Hanged Man (returning from The House of the Dead)
 The Moon

Notes

References

External links 
 Official Japanese website

2018 video games
Arcade video games
Arcade-only video games
Cooperative video games
Head-to-head arcade video games
Interquel video games
Light gun games
Rail shooters
Sega arcade games
The House of the Dead
Video games developed in Japan
Unreal Engine games
Video games set in 2006
Video games set in the United States